State Route 126 (SR 126) is a primary state highway in the U.S. state of Virginia.  Known as Fairgrounds Road, the state highway runs  from SR 179 in Onancock east to U.S. Route 13 Business (US 13 Business) and SR 316 at Tasley.

Route description

SR 126 begins at an intersection with SR 179 (Market Street) in the town of Onancock.  The state highway heads east as a two-lane undivided road and leaves the town of Onancock by crossing the North Branch of Onancock Creek.  SR 126 reaches its eastern terminus as the west leg of a roundabout in Tasley.  SR 316 heads north as Greenbush Road toward Greenbush; US 13 Business heads east (north) as Tasley Road toward Accomac, the county seat of Accomack County, and south as Coastal Boulevard toward Onley.

Major intersections

References

External links

Virginia Highways Project: VA 126

126
State Route 126